WBV, or wbv, may refer to:

Whole body vibration, a generic term used when vibrations of any frequency are transferred to the human body
wbv, the ISO 639-3 code for the Wajarri language in Murchison, Western Australia